This is the Juno Beach order of battle on D-Day.

Canadian Army

3rd Canadian Infantry Division Divisional Troops
 Headquarters 3rd Canadian Division. General officer commanding: Major General Rod Keller
 3rd Infantry Division Signals Regiment, Royal Canadian Corps of Signals
 No. 3 Defence and Employment Platoon (Lorne Scots)
 No. 4 Canadian Provost Company, Canadian Provost Corps
 2nd Canadian Armoured Brigade. Commander: Brigadier R.A. Wyman
 6th Armoured Regiment (1st Hussars)
 10th Armoured Regiment (The Fort Garry Horse)
 27th Armoured Regiment (The Sherbrooke Fusilier Regiment)
 Divisional reconnaissance and divisional machine gun / mortar
 7th Reconnaissance Regiment (17th Duke of York's Royal Canadian Hussars)
 The Cameron Highlanders of Ottawa (machine gun and mortar 4.2 in)
 Royal Regiment of Canadian Artillery – divisional artillery (allocated for landings)
 Headquarters RCA 3rd Division – CRA: Brigadier P.A.S. Todd
 12th Field Artillery Regiment, RCA
 13th Field Artillery Regiment, RCA
 14th Field Artillery Regiment, RCA
 19th Field Artillery Regiment, RCA
 3rd Anti-tank Regiment, RCA
 4th Light Anti-aircraft Regiment, RCA
 Corps of Royal Canadian Engineers – divisional engineers
 Headquarters RCE 3rd Division – CRE: Lieutenant-Colonel R.J. Cassidy
 5th Canadian Field Company, RCE (Obstacle Clearance: Attached from I Canadian Corps Army Troops Engineers)
 6th Canadian Field Company, RCE (Assault with 7th Canadian Infantry Brigade)
 16th Canadian Field Company, RCE (Assault with 8th Canadian Infantry Brigade)
 18th Canadian Field Company, RCE (Obstacle Clearance)
 3rd Canadian Field Park Company, RCE
 3 Canadian Divisional Bridge Platoon, RCE (Lt A. Secter)

7th Canadian Infantry (Assault) Brigade Group – Mike Green / Mike Red and Nan Green Beaches
 Headquarters 7th Infantry Brigade. Commander: Brigadier H.W. Foster
 The Royal Winnipeg Rifles
 The Canadian Scottish Regiment (Princess Mary's)
 The Regina Rifle Regiment
 6th Armoured Regiment (1st Hussars) (Sherman DD tanks)
 12th and 13th Field Regiments (SP), RCA
 A Company (MG) and D Company, The Cameron Highlanders of Ottawa (Machine Gun)
 Platoon, 6th Canadian Field Company, RCE
 248 A/T Battery, 62nd (6th London) Anti-Tank Regiment RA (TA), with M10 self-propelled guns (from British I Corps)
 7th Infantry Brigade Ground Defence Platoon (Lorne Scots)
 No. 3 Battery, 2nd Royal Marine Armoured Support Regiment with Centaur Close Support tanks

8th Canadian Infantry (Assault) Brigade Group – Nan White and Nan Red Beaches
 Headquarters 8th Infantry Brigade. Commander: Brigadier K.G. Blackader
 The Queen's Own Rifles of Canada
 The North Shore (New Brunswick) Regiment
 Le Régiment de la Chaudière
 10th Armoured Regiment (The Fort Garry Horse) (Sherman DD tanks)
 14th and 19th Field Regiments (SP), RCA Royal Regiment of Canadian Artillery
 B Company (MG), The Cameron Highlanders of Ottawa (Machine Gun)
 Platoon, 16th Canadian Field Company, RCE
 246 A/T Battery, 62 Anti-Tank Regiment RA (TA) (M10s) - from I Corps
 8th Infantry Brigade Ground Defence Platoon (Lorne Scots)
 No. 4 Battery, 2nd Royal Marine Armoured Support Regiment (Centaur close support tank)

9th Canadian Infantry Brigade – Landing through 8th CIB on Nan Beaches
 Headquarters 9th Infantry Brigade. Commander: Brigadier D.G. Cunningham
 The Highland Light Infantry of Canada
 The Stormont, Dundas and Glengarry Highlanders
 The North Nova Scotia Highlanders
 27th Armoured Regiment (The Sherbrooke Fusiliers Regiment)
 C Company (MG) and 1/2 D Company (4.2 in mortars), The Cameron Highlanders of Ottawa (Machine Gun)
 9th Infantry Brigade Ground Defence Platoon (Lorne Scots)

Supporting corps divisional units integrated in Mike Sector and Nan Sector
 Royal Canadian Army Service Corps
 Royal Canadian Army Medical Corps
 No. 14, No. 22, No. 23 Field Ambulance and No. 17 Light Field Ambulance (2nd CAB)s
 Royal Canadian Dental Corps
 Royal Canadian Ordnance Corps
 Corps of Royal Canadian Electrical and Mechanical Engineers
 Canadian Chaplain Service

British Forces
British forces on Juno beach included units from Second Army and Combined Operations Headquarters
 HQ, 4th Special Service Brigade
 No. 48 (Royal Marine) Commando
 Elements of 79th Armoured Division (specialist combat engineering and assault vehicles)
 "B" Squadron, 22nd Dragoons (Royal Armoured Corps) (Sherman Crab Mine flail)
 HQ, 5 Assault Regiment, Royal Engineers (Detachment)
 26 Assault Squadron, RE (Churchill AVRE)
 80 Assault Squadron, RE (Churchill AVRE)
 71st Field Company, RE (Attached)
 3rd and 4th Batteries, 2nd Royal Marine Armoured Support Regiment (Centaur tanks)
 Royal Armoured Corps
 C Squadron, Inns of Court Regiment (armoured car unit tasked with rushing the bridges over the Orne river, South of Caen)
 HQ 7th GHQ Troops Engineers, Royal Engineers – Comd: Col F.C. Nottingham (Landed as sub-units distributed amongst assaulting formations and Beach Groups)
 65th Field Company, RE
 72nd Field Company, RE
 85th Field Company, RE
 184th Field Company, RE
 240th Field Company, RE
 262nd (Sussex) Field Company, RE (attached from XII Corps Troops, Royal Engineers; distributed as beach obstacle clearance parties with 3rd Canadian Division)
 582nd Field Company, RE
 Platoon of 19th Field Company, RE (attached from I Corps Troops RE)
 297th Field Park Company, RE
 19th & 20th Stores Sections, RE
 59th & 61st Mechanical Equipment Sections, RE
 204th Works Section, RE
 670th & 710th Artisan Works Companies, RE
 Two Advanced Park Sections of 176th Workshop and Park Company, RE
 48th Bomb Disposal Section, RE
 1033rd & 1034th Port Operating Companies, RE
 966th Inland Water Transport Operating Company, RE
 1622nd Bailey Platoon of 106th Bridge Company, Royal Army Service Corps (RASC)

102 Beach Sub-Area
 No.7 Beach Group, Mike sector, including:
 8th (Irish) Battalion, King's Regiment
 'O' Anti-Aircraft Assault Group (from 80th Anti-Aircraft Brigade)
 Regimental HQ 114th Light AA Regiment – Comd: Lt-Col N.W. Hoare
 372nd Battery, 114th LAA Regiment, less C Troop
 321st Battery, 93rd LAA Regiment, less E Troop
 274th Battery, 86th HAA Regiment
 1 Troop 383rd Battery, 86th HAA Regiment
 474th (Independent) Searchlight Battery, less B and C Troops
 112nd Company, Pioneer Corps, less detachments
 114th LAA Regiment Workshop, Royal Electrical and Mechanical Engineers (REME)
 No. 8 Beach Group, Nan sector, including:
 5th Battalion Royal Berkshire Regiment
 'P' AA Assault Group (from 80th AA Brigade)
 Regimental HQ 86th (Honourable Artillery Company) Heavy AA Regiment – Comd: Lt-Col G.H. Champness
 273rd Battery, 86th HAA Regiment
 383rd Battery, 86th HAA Regiment less 1 Troop
 375th Battery, 114th LAA Regiment
 1 Troop 296th Battery, 73rd LAA Regiment
 1 Troop 321st Battery, 93rd LAA Regiment
 155th AA Operations Room
 Detachment 112nd Pioneer Company
 86th HAA Regiment Workshop, REME
 In reserve No.4 Beach Group

Naval forces
Force J was commanded by the British, and the flagship vessel came from the Royal Navy. Among the chief vessels in this combined British and Canadian Force were
 HMS Hilary infantry landing and headquarters ship

The force also included 109 Royal Canadian Navy vessels, among them:
 Two of the 11 destroyers (7 Fleet Class and 4 Hunt-class) were Canadian RCN:
 HMCS Algonquin
 HMCS Sioux
 Two of the Landing Ships Infantry (Medium) were Canadian RCN:
 HMCS Prince Henry
 HMCS Prince David

Landing craft from both the RN and RCN were employed in Force J, the total number were:
 1 Landing Ship Headquarters
 2 Assault Group Headquarters Ship
 3 Landing Ships Infantry (Large)
 3 Landing Ships Infantry (Medium)
 12 Landing Ships Infantry (Hand Hoisting)
 20 Landing Craft Infantry (Large)
 8 Landing Craft Infantry (Small)
 142 Landing Craft Assault
 4 Landing Craft Assault (Obstacle Clearance)
 18 Landing Craft Assault (Hedgerow)
 8 Landing Craft Support (Medium)
 4 Landing Craft Headquarters
 22 Landing Ship Tank Mark II
 2 Landing Craft Tank Mark III (Flotilla of 10 craft each)
 7 Landing Craft Tank Mark IV (Flotilla of 10 craft each)
 2 Landing Craft Tank Mark V/VI (Flotilla of 10 craft each)
 7 Landing Craft Flak
 7 Landing Craft Gun (Large)
 7 Landing Craft Tank (Armoured)
 8 Landing Craft Tank (High Explosive)
 9 Landing Craft Tank (Rocket)
 36 Landing Craft Personnel (Large) Smoke Layer
 4 Landing Barge Flak
 4 Landing Craft Support (Large) Mark I
 3 Landing Craft Support (Large) Mark II
 1 Landing Ship Dock
 15 Rhino ferry

German forces

Standing against the 3rd Canadian Infantry Division, units of 716.Infanterie-Division (Static) – Wehrmacht Heer Coastal Defence (Bodenständigen) had little tactical mobility and its personnel, in general, belonged to the lowest category of conscript, coming from older age groups or from the Landsturm: Military District 6. While the division in Normandy with the fewest personnel; fronting the Juno sector, its density of troops was a little stronger than elsewhere. The division had no combat experience before D-Day, and on 1 May 1944 it only had 7,771 personnel of all ranks.

The 716. Infanterie-Division consisted of:
 716.Division – HQ Stab Gefechtsstand: Caen: La Folie-Couvrechef  – GOC: Generalleutnant Wilhelm Richter
 Nachrichten-Abteilung 716. Kdr Major Werner Liedloff (Signals)
 K.V.A. H1 / Küsten Verteidigung Abschnitt Caen. Kdr: Generalleutnant Wilhelm Richter. Gefechtsstand: Caen - La Folie-Couvrechef  
 K.V.-Gruppe. Küsten Verteidigung Gruppe Courseulles: 
 K.V.U.-Gr. Küsten Verteidigung Unter Gruppe Meuvaines: Major Lehman - Kdr Bataillon II. / 726. Gefechtsstand: St. Croix sur Mer (Bazenville)
 K.V.U.-Gr. Küsten Verteidigung Unter Gruppe Seulles: Hauptmann Deptolla - Kdr Bataillon II. / 736. Gefechtsstand: Château de Tailleville at WN 23
 K.V.-Gruppe. Küsten Verteidigung Gruppe Riva-Bella: Oberst Ludwig Krug - Kdr Grenadier-Regiment 736. Gefechtsstand: Colleville-sur-Orne at WN 17 Höhe
 K.V.U.-Gr. Küsten Verteidigung Unter Gruppe Orne: - Kdr Bataillon I. / 736. Gefechtsstand: Colleville-sur-Orne
 K.V.U.-Gr. Küsten Verteidigung Unter Gruppe Luc: Major Pipor - Kdr Bataillon III. / 736. Gefechtsstand: Cresserons
 716.Division – Artillerie-Regiment 1716.
 Bataillon I. / 1716 AR. East of Orne:  WN 17 Beauvais
 Bttn 1. Merville WN01 - NW Gonneville-sur-Orne
 Bttn 2. Southwest of Colleville-sur-Orne - At WN16
 Bttn 3. East of Orne - At Brieville
 Bttn 4. Southwest Ouistreham - Château d'Eau: At WN12
 Bataillon II. / 1716 AR. Ouistreham: West of Crepon
 Bttn 5. Between South Crepon and Bazenville: At WN36a
 Bttn 6. La Mare-Fontaine: Between Crepon and Bazenville - At WN32
 Bttn 7.(Resi) North le Moulin sur Mue - West Bény-sur-Mer: At WN28 
 Bataillon III. / 1716 AR. Northwest of Caen: NOT in 716 Inf.Div. Sector
 Bttn 8 Not in 716 Div Sector: At Maisy La Martiniere - WN84 (352 Inf Div)
 Bttn 9. Not in 716 Div Sector: At Maisy Les Perruques - WN83 (352 Inf Div)
 Bttn 10. (Waldersee) At Plumetot - N.E. Bayeux
 GHQ Heeres-schwere-Artillerie-Abteilung 989. (Heeresgruppe-Reserve Attached) Gefechtsstand: Northeast of Reviers.• 
 Batterie 1. / s.Art.-Abtl 989. Southwest of Basly - Moved to Bénouville (x4 12.2 cm s.F.H. 396 (r))
 Batterie 2. / s.Art.-Abtl 989. At Amblie - East of The Seulles (x4 12.2 cm s.F.H. 396 (r)) 
 Batterie 3. / s.Art.-Abtl 989. East of Creully (x4 12.2 cm s.F.H. 396 (r))
 Herres-Kusten-Artillerie-Abteilung 1260. (Attached) Gefechtsstand – Arromanches• 
 1. Bttr. / H.K.A. Abtl 1260. At St. Aubin-d’Arquenay: WN 08 - Ouistreham (x6 15.5 cm K 420 (f))
 2. Bttr. / H.K.A. Abtl 1260. East of Arromanches - Attached to 352. Inf.Div. 
 3. Bttr. / H.K.A. Abtl 1260. At WN 35a - Mont Fleury (x4 12.2 cm K 390 (r))
 4. Bttr. (MKM) / H.K.A. Abtl 1260. At WN 48 - Longues (x4 15 cm TbtsK C/36)
 Flak-Zug / H.K.A. Abtl 1260.
 Grenadier-Regiment 726. Oberst Walter Korfes Gefechtsstand : Château de Sully - Bayeux Attached to 352.Inf.-Div 
 Bataillon I./726.   Stab & Kompanie 1/2/3/4 – Attached to 352.Inf.Div
 Bataillon II./726.  HQ Stab. Gefechtsstand: At Ste-Croix-sur-Mer: KVU-Gr Meuvaines
 Kompanie 5./II. East of Tierceville, North of Colombiers-sur-Seulles
 Kompanie 6./II. At Bazenville, Northwest of Villiers-le-Sec
 Kompanie 7./II. West of Banville, South of Ste-Croix-sur-Mer
 Kompanie 8.(schwere) /II. South of Crepon, North of Creully
 Bataillon III./726. Stab & Kompanie 9/10/11/12 – Grandcamp-les-Bains: Attached to 352.Inf.Div
 Bataillon IV./726. 439.Ost-Battalion: Attached to 352.Inf.Div
 14(PaK) Kompanie. At Hameau de Vaux - Behind Vaux-Le Buisson
 Grenadier-Regiment 736. Oberst Ludwig Krug Stab: Colleville-sur-Orne 
 Bataillon I./736.  Stab I. Gefechtsstand: Ouistreham – Kdr KVU-Gr Orne. Kompanie 1/2/3/4 - (Riva Bella - UK Sword Sector)
 Bataillon II./736. Stab II. Gefechtsstand: Château de Tailleville – Kdr KVU-Gr Seulles (WN 23)
 Kompanie 5./ II. KoKdr Hauptmann Rudolf Grute
 Zug - At Bernières-sur-Mer: WN 28 and WN28a 
 Zug / Stab Gruppen - At Saint Aubin-sur-Mer: WN 27 
 Kompanie 6./ II. KoKdr Hauptmann Grote
 Zug - At Courseulles-sur-Mer EAST: WN 29  
 Zug - At Courseulles-sur-Mer WEST: WN 31 
 Zug-Gruppen - At Courseulles-sur-Mer SOUTH: WN 30 
 Kompanie 7./ II. La Rivière and Ver-sur-Mer (WN 33 UK Gold)
 Kompanie 8.(schwere)/ II. Bn Reserve: Field Position – Les Ruines Saint-Ursin (La Tombette)
 Bataillon III./736. Stab III. Gefechtsstand: Cresserons – Kdr KVUGr Luc (KVGr Riva Bella: UK Sword Sector)
 Kompanie  9./ III. Langrunne-sur-Mer and Luc-sur-Mer (WN 24 UK Sword)
 Kompanie 10./ III. Lion-sur-Mer and Hermanville-sur-Mer (WN 20 UK Sword)
 Kompanie 11./ III. Bn Reserve: South of Tailleville - Northwest of Cresserons
 Kompanie 12./ III. Bn Reserve: North of Douvres (WN 23a) and la-Délivrande (WN 22) (UK Sword)
 Bataillon IV./736. 642. Ost-Battalion: Stab: Amfreville – Kompanie 1/2/3/4 (KV-Gr Riva Bella UK Sword)
 14(PaK) Kompanie: Luc-sur-Mer and Lion-sur-Mer (UK Sword)
 Ost-Battalion 441 (Ukrainian). (Attached) Stab: de Mars-Fontaine, SW Ver-sur-Mer 
 Einsatzfaehig - KVU-Gr. Seulles: Infanterie-Division 716. (Anlandungen: CA Juno)
 Kompanie 2.  (Jagdkommando-Kp. 52)  Bn Reserve: Southeast of Courseulles-sur-Mer, At Les Rotys, 
 Einsatzfaehig - KVU-Gr. Meuvaines: Infanterie-Division 352. (Anlandungen: UK Gold)
 Kompanie 1. (Ukrainer-Kp. 52)  Hameau de Vaux (Aerium de Graye - Le Buisson) at WN 33a 
 Kompanie 3.  West of Ver-sur-Mer, At Le Hable de Heurtot
 Kompanie 4.  East of Ver-sur-Mer
 Panzerjäger-Abteilung 716. Gefechtsstand: Oberleutnant Kurt Kaergel – Biéville 
 Kompanie 1. (Sfl) / Pz.Jg-Abt 716.  Gefechtsstand: At la Croix de Bois Biéville - North of Caen,
 Kompanie 2. (StuG) / Pz.Jg-Abt 716. Gefechtsstand: At Reviers
 Zug - Graye-sur-Mer - Hameau de la Valette: x3 7.5 cm Pak 40
 Zug - Courseulles-sur-Mer South - Les Champs des Fers: x3 7.5 cm Pak 40
 Zug - Berniers-sur-Mer - Les Perrucques: x2 8.8 cm Pak 43/41
 Kompanie 3. (FlaK) / Pz.Jg-Abt 716. Gefechtsstand: At Sallenelles
 Zug - At Tailleville la Tomblette: x6 7.5 cm D.C.A. Mle 1938(f) AA Guns.
 Zug - At Tailleville la Tomblette: x20 3.2 cm Wurfgerät 40/41 Packkiste.
 Zug - At Anisy. On Trailers:2 cm Flak 30/38/Flakvierling
 Pionier-Bataillon 716. Gefechtsstand: Herouvillette-Haras
 Kompanie 1. Hérouvillette, Northeast of Caen
 Kompanie 2. Detached to 352.Inf.Div and Garrisoned: At Anisy / Mathieu
 Kompanie 3. Detached to 352.Inf.Div
 Schnelle-Brigade 30 / 716. Heeresgruppe-Reserve (Ersatzheer). Gefechtsstand: Coutances. Commander: Oberstleutnant H.F. von und Aufsess
 Schnelle-Abteilung 513 [Bicycle]. Attached 06.06.1944 - Gefechtsstand: In Location At Coutances (West of St.Lo)
 Schnelle-Abteilung 517 [Bicycle]. Attached 06.06.1944 - Gefechtsstand: In Location At Bréhal (South West of St.Lo)
 Schnelle-Abteilung 518 [Bicycle]. Attached 06.06.1944 - Gefechtsstand: In Location At Cérences (South West of St.Lo)
 716.Division – Divisional Troops.
 716.Division – Versorgungs-truppen 716. (Supply)
 716.Division – Verwaltungs-zug 716. (Food Services)
 716.Division – Sanitäts-Btl 716. (Medical)
 716.Division - Nachschub-Btl 716. (Transportation)

Panzer-Division 21., belonging to XXXXVII Pz.Gr.West, was allocated to AOK.7 (Army Group B) as its (only) reserve. Pz.Div.21 was reconstituted on 15 July 1943, in the reorganization of schnellen Brigade West (SB 931). Pz.Div.21 was absent from Normandy from March 1944, for Operation Maragretha, in Hungary, until May 1944, when it was reassigned to Brittany, and then moved up into Normandy. On 6 June 1944, Panzer-Division 21., on its initiative, adopted a 'new' organization for battle, as Regimental (Brigade) Groups were formed, PzKGr.Oppeln - Pz.Regt.22., and KGr.Luck - Pz.Gren-Regt 125., they regrouping an infantry battalion for a tank battalion, and KGr.Rauch - Pz.Gren-Regt192., was formed, given Panzer-Artillerie-Regiment 155., assigned a battalion to each Kampfgruppe. The Canadians, coming South, from Juno Beach, did not experience a direct impact from either PzKGr.Oppeln or KGr.Luck and only felt a slight impact, in their area of influence, from the counter-move undertaken by KGr.Rauch, on 6 June.
 Panzer-Division.21. Gefechtsstand: St. Pierre-sur-Dives (Begleitkompanie)
 GOC Kommandeur: Generalmajor Edgar Feuchtinger 
 Panzer-Aufklärung-Abteilung. 21. Gefechtsstand: SE of Condé-sur-Noireau: x5 Kompanien (some Pz.)
 Panzer-Regiment. 22. (former Pz.Regt.100.) Gefechtsstand: Aubigny (with Pz.FlaK-Ko.)
 Kdr: Oberst Hermann von Oppeln-Bronikowski (PzKGr. Oppeln: North of Caen - West of Orne – From 06.06.44)
 I. Btl. /Pz.Regt. 22.  Stab: Jort (Saint Piere-sur-Dives) StabsKo & Pz.Kompanien: 1. 2. 3. 4. 
 II. Btl. /Pz.Regt. 22. Stab: Fresné-la-Mère (Falaise) StabsKo & Pz.Kompanien: 5. 6. 7. 8.
 Panzer-Grenadier-Regiment. 125(tgp) Gefechtsstand: Vimont (Stabs Ko.)
 Kdr: (Baron) Major Freiherr Hans von Luck (KGr. Luck:  East of Orne – From 06.06.44)
 I. Btl.  (Gepanzert) Stab: Fierville-la-Campagne: Kompanien (SPW) 1. 2. 3. & Kompanien  4.(sch) 
 II. Btl. (Motorized) Stab:  Colombelles:
 Kompanien (Mot.) 5. Northwest of Troarn
 Kompanien (Mot.) 6. Les Carrieres - North of Chateau Bannevilles-les-Campagnes
 Kompanien (Mot.) 7. Rainville
 Kompanien 8.(sch)   East of Colombelles
 9. Kompanie (s.IG) /125.   Colombelles
 10. Kompanie (s-Werfer) /125. Colombelles
 Panzer-Grenadier-Regiment. 192 (mot.)  Gefechtsstand: Thury-Harcourt (Stabs Ko.) 
 Kdr: Oberst Josef Rauch (KGr. Rauch: Northwest of Caen – From 06.06.44)
 I. Btl. (Gepanzert) Stab: Verson:  Kompanien (SPW)  1. 2. 3. 4.
 II. Btl. (Motorized) HQ Stab: Le Mesnil (Anisy) (13 May) Stabs Ko: Villons-les-Buissons 
 Kompanien 5. (Mot.) At Château la Londe, Northeast of Epron (verst.)
 Kompanien 6. (Mot.) Buron
 Kompanien 7. (Mot.) North of Périers-sur-le-Dan (Hermanville) (verst.) Southeast of Plumetot
 Kompanien 8. (sch.) At Cairon and then KUGr Braatz – Bénouville Caen Canal Bridge
 9. Kompanie (s.IG)/192. At Croisilles
 10. Kompanie (Werfer)/192. At Thury-Harcourt
 Panzer- Artillerie-Regiment. 155. Gefechtsstand:  St. André-sur-Orne  
 Kdr: Oberst Hühne 
 I. Btl./155. Gefechtsstand –  Mathieu: 
 Bttn 1. (sfl)  Northwest of Beuville 
 Bttn 2. (Mot.) West of Périers-sur-le-Dan (WN 21a) 
 Bttn 3. (SPW)  Northwest of Colomby-sur-Thaon
 II. Btl./155. Gefechtsstand – May-sur-Orne:   4. Bttn.  / 5. Bttn. / 6. Bttn.
 III. Btl./155. Gefechtsstand – Thury-Harcourt:  7. Bttn.  / 8. Bttn. / 9. Bttn.
 10. Batterien (gp). (s.Werfer) 
 Heeres-Flakartillerie-Abteilung. (H.-Flak-Abtl.) 305. Gefechtsstand: Hérouville Kdr: Hauptmann Ohlendorf
 1. Bttn. SE of Caen
 2. Bttn. West of Caen
 3. Bttn. At St. Pierre sur Dives 
 4. Bttn.
 5. Bttn.
 Heeresflakabt.200. 
 I. Bttn. Flak
 II. Bttn. Flak
 III Bttn. gemischte Flak
 Sturmgeschütz-Abteilung 200 (Stug.-Abtl. 200) Gefechtsstand: Quetteville
 Batterien. 1.  
 Batterien. 2.
 Batterien. 3.
 Batterien. 4.
 Batterien (Ko) 5. / Stug.-Abtl. 200.  From Cambes-en-Plasne at Epron- North of Caen
 Panzerjäger-Abteilung 200 (Pz.Jg.-Abtl. 200). Kdr: Hauptmann Werner von Lyncker, Stab: Saint-Pierre (Maison des Trois Chimnees) Tilly-sur-Seulles 
 Kompanie 1.(sfl) / Pz.Jg.ABt 200. Stab: Châteux de Grand-Tonne, At Sainte-Croix- Grand-Tonne (Martagny)
 Kompanie 2.(sfl) / Pz.Jg.ABt200. Stab: Château du Mesnil-Patry, At Le Mesnil-Patry (Putot)
 Kompanie 3.(sfl) / Pz.Jg.ABt 200. Stab: Camilly, South of Le Fresnet-Camilly
 Panzer-Pionier-Bataillon 220. Gefechtsstand: Clécy -Saint-Remy 
 Pz.Pi.Kompanie 1.(SPW) /220. At Quesnay, Northeast of Falaise
 Pz.Pi.Kompanie 2.(SPW) /220. Gaillon and Vernon, Southeast of Rouen (Detached)
 Pi Kompanie 3. (Mot.) /220.  At Creully, Northeast of Bayeau
 Pi.Zug Brücken-(Brüko) Kolonne
 Pz.Div.21 – Divisions-Einheiten
 Pz. Nachschubtruppen 200.
 Pz. Nachrichtenabteilung 200.
 Pz. Feld-Ersatz.Bataillon 200.  Gefechtsstand: Condé-sur-Noireau – Stab & Kompanien 1. 2. 3. 4.

Notes

References
 
 Juno Beach - The Canadians On D-Day
 3rd Canadian Infantry Division

World War II orders of battle